TusCon is a science fiction convention that has been held annually in Tucson, Arizona since 1974, making it the oldest continuous science fiction convention in the state of Arizona. It is currently presented every November by the Baja Arizona Science Fiction Association (BASFA), a 501(c)(4) not-for-profit corporation.

Notable guests 
TusCon has had a number of professional writers and artists as Guest of Honor in its history. Included are Evangeline Walton, Gordon Eklund, Theodore Sturgeon, Ed Bryant, Suzy McKee Charnas, George R.R. Martin, Elizabeth A. Lynn, Robert Bloch, Karl Edward Wagner, John Varley, Terry Carr, Tim Powers, Stephen R. Donaldson, David Brin, Dennis McKiernan, Laurell K. Hamilton, and many others.

In addition to the scheduled Guest of Honor, TusCon has had a reputation of having many professional writers, artists, and publishers attend the convention. Among those are Forrest J. Ackerman, Robert Asprin, Keith Henson, S. P. Somtow, David Schow, Dr. Edwin "Buzz" Aldrin, Simon Hawke, Liz Danforth, Judith Tarr, Patrick Nielsen Hayden, and others.

Activities 
In addition to the type of events that are prevalent at most conventions, TusCon has developed several different activities that have been adopted at other conventions. These include a Writers Workshop and contest held in conjunction with the Tucson-Pima Co. Municipal Library, An "adults-only" Midnight masquerade where costumes (or the lack thereof) tended to stretch societal norms, a "Furry Critter Stomp" where a dance floor was littered with a variety of nondescript plush beanbag "critters" and Congoers were invited to dance without concern for foot placement, a flintknapping seminar by Dr. Susan Gleason, and chili served to Convention members during the "Dead Dog Party" on the last day of the Con.

External links 
 TusCon Homepage
 History of TusCon (with Photos)

1974 establishments in Arizona
Science fiction conventions in the United States
Festivals in Tucson, Arizona
Recurring events established in 1974